Elena Grinenko is a professional ballroom dance champion, choreographer, and instructor. She is best known as one of the professional dancers on the American television series Dancing with the Stars.

Biography
Grinenko was born in Moscow, Russia, USSR, on December 14, 1976 and has been dancing since she was seven years old. She has been trained in ballroom dancing, ballet and Russian folk dancing. She worked with the Ballroom Formation Team of Russia, and when she reached her third year as a competitive professional dancer, she became a Soviet Union Finalist.

In 1994, she emerged as the Latin Division winner at both the Moscow and National Championships. She graduated from high school in 1995, and from there went on to study various kinds of dances at the Art Academy of Russia. In 1998, she moved to the United States, where she became one of the fastest rising stars in the dancing industry.

On August 17, 2012, she married model and actor Rib Hillis.

Partnerships
After ten years of dancing with Michael Nadtochy, with whom she was Russian National Champion, she decided to form a partnership with Maksim Chmerkovskiy. Together they became one of the top finalist couples in the world in International Latin. Eventually, she was the undefeated U.S. and World Rhythm Champion with her last partner, Tony Dovolani.

Dancing with the Stars
In 2006, Grinenko found herself competing against former Latin partner Chmerkovskiy, and American rhythm partner Dovolani when she was selected to join the cast of the third season of Dancing with the Stars.

She was paired with journalist Tucker Carlson; they were eliminated the first week.

Grinenko returned to the ballroom for the fourth season, and was partnered with NBA star Clyde Drexler. They were the fourth couple to be eliminated. This ranked them in eighth place.

Dancing with the Stars performances
With celebrity partner Tucker Carlson:

With celebrity partner Clyde Drexler:

Second World Dance Championship 
In 2010, Grinenko was representing U.S.A. in the Second Dance World Championship (celebrated in Mexico). She was paired with Paul Barris. Elena came out from the competition after learning that she was pregnant. Her replacement was Snejana Petrova

Achievements

See also
 U.S. National Dancesport Champions (Professional Rhythm)
 Dancing with the Stars (U.S. season 3)
 Dancing with the Stars (U.S. season 4)

References

1976 births
Dancers from Moscow
Living people
Russian ballroom dancers
Russian female dancers
Participants in American reality television series
21st-century Russian dancers